Big Sandy Creek is a  mountain stream which begins in Fayette County, Pennsylvania, and flows into Preston County, West Virginia, in the United States. The Big Sandy flows through Bruceton Mills and Rockville, West Virginia, before crashing down the mountainside and reaching its confluence with the Cheat River at the abandoned town of Jenkinsburg.

The Big Sandy is a popular whitewater kayaking run, a destination for paddlers from many states in the late winter and early spring. The most commonly run section is the Class-V Lower Big Sandy, from Rockville to Jenkinsburg, which contains two runnable waterfalls: Wonder Falls (Class IV) and Big Splat (Class 5.1).

See also
 List of rivers of Pennsylvania
 List of rivers of West Virginia

References

External links
 National Whitewater River Inventory:
 Lower Big Sandy
 Upper Big Sandy
 Little Sandy
 Friends of the Cheat

Rivers of Preston County, West Virginia
Rivers of Pennsylvania
Rivers of West Virginia
Tributaries of the Monongahela River
Rivers of Fayette County, Pennsylvania